Cody Williams is an American basketball player who currently attends Perry High School. Williams has committed to play for the University of Colorado.

Early life and high school
Williams was born in Colorado and has grown up in Gilbert, Arizona after his family moved there when he was young. He attends Perry High School. As a junior, Williams was named the Premier Region Player of the Year after averaging 13 points, four rebounds, three assists, and two steals per game as Perry won the Class 6A state championship. Williams was selected to play in the 2023 McDonald's All-American Boys Game during his senior year. He was also selected to play for Team USA in the Nike Hoops Summit.

Recruiting
Williams is a consensus five-star recruit and one of the top players in the 2023 class, according to major recruiting services. In November 2022, Williams committed to play college basketball at Colorado after considering offers from LSU, Arizona, UCLA, and USC.

Personal life
Williams's older brother, Jalen Williams, currently plays for the Oklahoma City Thunder in the National Basketball Association.

References

External links
USA Basketball bio

Living people
American men's basketball players
Basketball players from Arizona
Small forwards
Year of birth missing (living people)